Harchandpur is a village and corresponding community development block in Raebareli district, Uttar Pradesh, India. It is located on the Baiti river, which is a tributary of the Sai, and it is northeast from the district headquarters on the road to Lucknow. Particularly since the coming of the railway in the 1800s, Harchandpur serves as one of the main commercial centres for the surrounding region; it is also a major exporter of local goods. As of 2011, its population is 4,348 people, in 833 households.

Harchandpur is also a constituency of the Uttar Pradesh Legislative Assembly, under the district of Raebareli. The Pin Code of the town is 229303 and there are 47 Gram panchayats under Harchandpur.

History
Harchand was founded by Nabh Rai, a Kayastha who served as the diwan to the Bais raja Tilok Chand, and named after his son Har Chand, who was adopted in 1350 Samvat. His descendants are still major landowners in Harchandpur; one of them, Jai Narain Srivastava, was appointed the first Station Master of Harchandpur Railway Station in 1893.

With the opening of the Oudh and Rohilkhand Railway in the 1800s, Harchandpur experienced a boom in commercial activity. The main line of the railway passed through town, and the Harchandpur railway station quickly became a major point of export for local goods like grain, hides, and oilseeds. The Raghubarganj bazar in Harchandpur was founded by Thakurain Udairaj Kunwar in 1894 (after the opening of the station) and named after her late husband Raghubar Bakhsh Singh, the taluqdar of Hasnapur. By 1905, it was described as one of the main markets in the Raebareli tehsil. At that point, it also had a post office, a cattle pound, and a large primary school, as well as a military encampment on the road to the northwest. The population in 1901 was 1,457, including many Brahmins and Banias.

Transport

Road
Harchandpur is on the route of National Highway 30, between Lucknow and Rae Bareli.

Bus
Uttar Pradesh State Road Transport Corporation (UPSRTC) buses also run here.

Rail
A rail line is Rae Bareli to Lucknow, on the Northern Railways network.

Air
Lucknow International Airport towards west (approx. 64 km)
Raebareli Airport toward east (approx. 30 km)

National Highway
National Highway 30 (India) NH 30 - Lucknow 》 Raebareli 》 Allahabad

Education 

Harchandpur has quality educational institutions affiliated to Central Board of Secondary Education, Uttar Pradesh Board, and CSJM University Kanpur. For primary education,nearly every village has a government school and a number of new private institutions have also footholded in recent past.

Colleges
Janpad Inter College, Harchandpur Raebareli.
Vishvanath Siksha Sansthan, Achleshwar.
Bal Vidya Mandir Inter College, Gangaganj.
Dayawati Modi Public School, Harchandpur.
P.D. Public School, Achleshwar.
Chandrapal Inter College, Gangaganj.
Mahavir Institute Of Technology & Management (MITM), Harchandpur.
Mahavir Institute Of Pharmacy, Kathwara Harchandpur. 
Vishvanath Singh Smarak Degree College, Rahwan.
 Sun Shine Public School, Harchandpur.
ABS Public School, Railway station Road Harchandpur
BLPS Public School, Harchandpur

Temples
Aastik Baba Temple, Lalupur
Achleshwar Dham, Achleshwar Market (Rahwan)
Maa Hulka Mandir, Baragadaha
Sevareshwar Temple, Seonthi
 Shani Temple, Harchandpur
 Hanuman mandir

Villages
Harchandpur CD block has the following 80 villages:

References

Villages in Raebareli district